Baihelu Station is a station on Line 2 of the Hohhot Metro. It opened on 1 October 2020.

References 

Hohhot Metro stations
Railway stations in China opened in 2020